Physcia is a genus of lichenized fungi in the family Physciaceae. The genus name means "inflated" or "sausage-like", referring to the form of the type species. According to a 2008 estimate, the widespread genus contains 73 species.

Species

Physcia adscendens – hooded rosette lichen
Physcia aipolia – hoary rosette lichen
Physcia alba
Physcia albata
Physcia atrostriata
Physcia austrocaesia
Physcia austrostellaris
Physcia biziana
Physcia caesia – blue-gray rosette lichen, powder-back lichen
Physcia caesiopsis
Physcia cinerea
Physcia clementei
Physcia convexa
Physcia convexella
Physcia crispa
Physcia dakotensis
Physcia decorticata
Physcia dimidiata
Physcia dubia
Physcia erumpens
Physcia halei
Physcia integrata
Physcia jackii
Physcia krogiae
Physcia littoralis
Physcia magnussonii
Physcia millegrana – mealy rosette lichen
Physcia nashii
Physcia neglecta
Physcia neonubila
Physcia nubila
Physcia phaea
Physcia poncinsii
Physcia pseudospeciosa
Physcia rolandii
Physcia rolfii
Physcia semipinnata
Physcia sinuosa
Physcia sorediosa
Physcia stellaris – star rosette lichen
Physcia tenella
Physcia tenellula
Physcia tretiachii
Physcia tribacia
Physcia tribacioides
Physcia tropica
Physcia undulata
Physcia verdonii
Physcia villosula
Physcia vitii

Gallery

References

Caliciales
Lichen genera
Caliciales genera
Taxa described in 1791